A transnational corporation is an enterprise that is involved with the international production of goods or services, foreign investments, or income and asset management in more than one country. It sets up factories in developing countries as land and labor are cheaper there.

Characteristics 
Transnational corporations share many qualities with multinational corporations, with the subtle difference being that multinational corporations consist of a centralized management structure, whereas transnational corporations generally are decentralized, with many bases in various countries where the corporation operates.  While traditional multinational corporations are national companies with foreign subsidiaries, transnational corporations spread out their operations in many countries to sustain high levels of local responsiveness.

A transnational corporation operates substantial facilities, does business in more than one country, and does not consider any particular country its corporate home. One of the significant advantages of a transnational company is that they are able to maintain a greater degree of responsiveness to the local markets where they maintain facilities. 

Transnationality also refers to the extent to which a firm engages in value-creating activities across national borders. Faced with accelerated globalization, managers often make decisions to expand a firm's transnationality in order to enable the firm to effectively compete with rivals on a global scale (e.g. Nestlé, Deutsche Post, Toyota, etc.), who employ senior executives from many countries and tries to make decisions from a global perspective rather than from one centralized headquarters. Actions taken with transnational cooperation can help create better relationships between nations. Resources that are found in nations often need to be spread out throughout the world and thus transnationality helps this process.

The history of transnational corporations dates back to Western Europe in the 16th century. During this time firms like the British East India Company were founded.

See also 
 Randolph Bourne

References

Political terminology
Transnationalism